The Democratic Centre, officially the Democratic Centre and Non-Partisan Public Workers (Demokrātiskais centrs un bezpartejiskie sabiedriskie darbinieki), was a political party in Latvia in the inter-war period.

History
The Democratic Centre was initially established as an alliance of the Workers' Party and the Latvian People's Party prior to the 1922 elections, in which it won six seats, becoming the fourth-largest faction in the first Saeima. The following year the two parties officially merged into the Democratic Centre.

The party won five seats in the 1925 elections, becoming the third-largest faction in the 2nd Saeima. The 1928 elections saw the party reduced to three seats, although it recovered to win six seats in the 1931 elections, which included the election of Berta Pīpiņa, the first woman elected to serve in the Saeima. The party was dissolved after the 15 May 1934 Latvian coup d'état.

References

Defunct political parties in Latvia
Defunct political party alliances in Latvia